Scottish English is the set of varieties of the English language spoken in Scotland. The transregional, standardised variety is called Scottish Standard English or Standard Scottish English (SSE). Scottish Standard English may be defined as "the characteristic speech of the professional class [in Scotland] and the accepted norm in schools". IETF language tag for "Scottish Standard English" is en-scotland.

In addition to distinct pronunciation, grammar and expressions, Scottish English has distinctive vocabulary, particularly pertaining to Scottish institutions such as the Church of Scotland, local government and the education and legal systems. 

Scottish Standard English is at one end of a bipolar linguistic continuum, with focused broad Scots at the other.
Scottish English may be influenced to varying degrees by Scots.
Many Scots speakers separate Scots and Scottish English as different registers depending on social circumstances. Some speakers code switch clearly from one to the other while others style shift in a less predictable and more fluctuating manner. Generally there is a shift to Scottish English in formal situations or with individuals of a higher social status.

Background
Scottish English resulted from language contact between Scots and the Standard English of England after the 17th century. The resulting shifts to English usage by Scots-speakers resulted in many phonological compromises and lexical transfers, often mistaken for mergers by linguists unfamiliar with the history of Scottish English. Furthermore, the process was also influenced by interdialectal forms, hypercorrections and spelling pronunciations. (See the section on phonology below.)

History

Convention traces the influence of the English of England upon Scots to the 16th-century Reformation and to the introduction of printing. Printing arrived in London in 1476, but the first printing press was not introduced to Scotland for another 30 years. Texts such as the Geneva Bible, printed in English, were widely distributed in Scotland in order to spread Protestant doctrine.

King James VI of Scotland became King James I of England in 1603. Since England was the larger and richer of the two Kingdoms, James moved his court to London in England. The poets of the court therefore moved south and "began adapting the language and style of their verse to the tastes of the English market". To this event McClure attributes "the sudden and total eclipse of Scots as a literary language". The continuing absence of a Scots translation of the Bible meant that the translation of King James into English was used in worship in both countries.

The Acts of Union 1707 amalgamated the Scottish and English Parliaments. However the church, educational and legal structures remained separate. This leads to important professional distinctions in the definitions of some words and terms. There are therefore words with precise definitions in Scottish English which are either not used in English English or have a different definition.

Phonology

The speech of the middle classes in Scotland tends to conform to the grammatical norms of the written standard, particularly in situations that are regarded as formal. Highland English is slightly different from the variety spoken in the Lowlands in that it is more phonologically, grammatically, and lexically influenced by a Gaelic substratum. Similarly, the English spoken in the North-East of Scotland tends to follow the phonology and grammar of Doric.

Although pronunciation features vary among speakers (depending on region and social status), there are a number of phonological aspects characteristic of Scottish English:

 Scottish English is mostly rhotic, meaning  is typically pronounced in the syllable coda, although some non-rhotic varieties are present in Edinburgh and Glasgow. The phoneme  may be a postalveolar approximant , as in Received Pronunciation or General American, but speakers have also traditionally used for the same phoneme a somewhat more common alveolar flap  or, now very rare, the alveolar trill  (hereafter,  will be used to denote any rhotic consonant).
Many varieties contrast  and  before  so that hoarse and horse are pronounced differently.
 before  is strong.
The phoneme  is common in names and in SSE's many Gaelic and Scots borrowings, so much so that it is often taught to incomers, particularly for "ch" in loch. Some Scottish speakers use it in words of Greek origin as well, such as technical, patriarch, etc. (Wells 1982, 408). 
 is usually velarised (see dark l) except in borrowings like "glen" (from Scottish Gaelic "gleann"), which had an unvelarised l in their original form. In areas where Scottish Gaelic was spoken until relatively recently (such as Dumfries and Galloway) and in areas where it is still spoken (such as the West Highlands), velarisation of  may be absent in many words in which it is present in other areas, but remains in borrowings that had velarised  in Gaelic, such as "loch" (Gaelic "loch") and "clan" (Gaelic "clann").
The past ending -ed may be realised with  where other accents use , chiefly after unstressed vowels: ended , carried 
The Scottish Vowel Length Rule is a distinctive part of many varieties of Scottish English (Scobbie et al. 1999), though vowel length is generally regarded as non-phonemic. Lengthening also occurs before a morpheme boundary, so that short need contrasts with long kneed, crude with crewed, and side with sighed.
Scottish English has no , instead transferring Scots . Phonetically, this vowel may be pronounced  or even . Thus pull and pool are homophones.
Cot and caught are not differentiated in most Central Scottish varieties, as they are in some other varieties.
In most varieties, there is no - distinction; therefore, bath, trap, and palm have the same vowel.
(See Pronunciation of English th.)
 may be more open  for certain speakers in some regions, so that it sounds more like  (although  and  do not merge).

Scotticisms

Scotticisms are idioms or expressions that are characteristic of Scots, especially when used in English. They are more likely to occur in spoken than written language.

The use of Scottish English, as well as of Scots and of Gaelic in Scotland, were documented over the 20th century by the Linguistic Survey of Scotland at the University of Edinburgh.

Examples include:

  meaning "What a dull, miserable, overcast day" (of weather)
  is the equivalent of the English crying.
 I'm feeling quite drouthy meaning "I'm feeling quite thirsty"
 That's a right (or real) scunner! meaning "That's extremely off-putting"
 The picture still looks squint meaning "The picture still looks askew/awry"
 You'd better just caw canny meaning "You'd better just go easy/Don't overdo it"
 His face is tripping him meaning "He's looking fed up"
 Just play the daft laddie meaning "Act ingenuously/feign ignorance"
 You're looking a bit peely-wally meaning "You're looking a bit off-colour"
 That's outwith my remit meaning "It's not part of my job to do that"
 It depends on what the high heid yins think meaning "It depends on what the heads of the organisation/management think"
 I'll come round (at) the back of eight meaning "I'll come round just after eight o'clock"
 We're all Jock Tamson's bairns, stock phrase meaning "None of us is better than anyone else" (i.e. socially superior)
 I kent his faither, stock phrase meaning "he started off as humbly as the rest of us before achieving success"
 You're standing there like a stookie meaning "you stand there as if incapable of stirring yourself" (like a plaster statue, a stucco figure)
 He's a right sweetie-wife meaning "He likes a good gossip"
 I didn't mean to cause a stooshie meaning "I didn't mean to cause a major fuss/commotion"
 I'm swithering whether to go meaning "I'm in two minds/uncertain as to whether to go"
 Ach, away ye go! stock phrase meaning "Oh, I don't believe you"

Scotticisms are generally divided into two types: covert Scotticisms, which generally go unnoticed as being particularly Scottish by those using them, and overt Scotticisms, usually used for stylistic effect, with those using them aware of their Scottish nature.

Lexical

Scottish English has inherited a number of lexical items from Scots, which are less common in other forms of standard English.

Old Norse , Dutch ). Examples of culturally specific items are Hogmanay, caber, haggis, bothy, scone (also used elsewhere in the British Isles), oatcake (now widespread in the UK), tablet, rone (roof gutter), teuchter, ned, numpty (witless person; now more common in the rest of the UK) and landward (rural); It's your shot for "It's your turn"; and the once notorious but now obsolete tawse.

The diminutive ending "-ie" is added to nouns to indicate smallness, as in laddie and lassie for a young boy and young girl. Other examples are peirie (child's wooden spinning top) and sweetie (piece of confectionery). The ending can be added to many words instinctively, e.g. bairn (see above) can become bairnie, a small shop can become a wee shoppie. These diminutives are particularly common among the older generations and when talking to children.

The use of "How?" meaning "Why?" is distinctive of Scottish, Northern English and Northern Irish English. "Why not?" is often rendered as "How no?".

There is a range of (often anglicised) legal and administrative vocabulary inherited from Scots, e.g. depute  for deputy, proven  for proved (standard in American English), interdict for '"injunction", and sheriff-substitute for "acting sheriff". In Scottish education a short leet is a list of selected job applicants, and a remit is a detailed job description. Provost is used for "mayor" and procurator fiscal for "public prosecutor".

Often, lexical differences between Scottish English and Southern Standard English are simply differences in the distribution of shared lexis, such as stay for "live" (as in: where do you stay?).

Grammatical

The progressive verb forms are used rather more frequently than in other varieties of standard English, for example with some stative verbs. The future progressive frequently implies an assumption.

In some areas perfect aspect of a verb is indicated using "be" as auxiliary with the preposition "after" and the present participle: for example "He is after going" instead of "He has gone" (this construction is borrowed from Scottish Gaelic).

The definite article tends to be used more frequently in phrases such as I've got the cold/the flu, he's at the school, I'm away to the kirk.

Speakers often use prepositions differently. The compound preposition off of is often used (Take that off of the table). Scots commonly say I was waiting on you (meaning "waiting for you"), which means something quite different in Standard English.

In colloquial speech shall and ought are scarce, must is marginal for obligation and may is rare. Here are other syntactical structures:

 What age are you? for "How old are you?"
 My hair is needing washed or My hair needs washed for "My hair needs washing" or "My hair needs to be washed".
 I'm just after telling you for "I've just told you".
 Amn't I invited? for Am I not invited?

Note that in Scottish English, the first person declarative I amn't invited and interrogative Amn't I invited? are both possible.

See also
 
 Bungi dialect of the Canadian Metis people of Scottish/British descent
 Dialect
 Glasgow dialect
 Hiberno-English
 Highland English
 Languages of the United Kingdom
 Regional accents of English
 Scottish Gaelic language
 Scottish Corpus of Texts and Speech
 Ulster English

References

Bibliography

 Aitken, A. J. (1979) "Scottish speech: a historical view with special reference to the Standard English of Scotland" in A. J. Aitken and Tom McArthur eds. Languages of Scotland, Edinburgh: Chambers, 85-118. Updated in next.

McClure, J. Derrick (1994) "English in Scotland", in

Further reading

External links
Listen to BBC Radio Scotland Live (many presenters, such as Robbie Shepherd, have a noticeable Scottish accent)
"Hover and hear" pronunciations in a Standard Scottish accent, and compare side by side with other English accents from Scotland and around the World.
BBC Voices - Listen to a lot of the voice recordings from many parts of the UK
Scottish Corpus of Texts & Speech - Multimedia corpus of Scots and Scottish English
Sounds Familiar?Listen to examples of Scottish English and other regional accents and dialects of the UK on the British Library's 'Sounds Familiar' website
Recent pronunciation changes in Scottish English (audio, starting at 7:10)

 
Standard English
Dialects of English